Großbetschkerek District ( or ; ;) was one of five administrative districts of the Voivodeship of Serbia and Banat of Temeschwar (a crown land within Austrian Empire) from 1850 to 1860. Its administrative center was Großbetschkerek (Serbian: Veliki Bečkerek).

History
The crown land Voivodeship of Serbia and Banat of Temeschwar was formed in 1849 and was initially divided into two districts: Batschka-Torontal and Temeschwar-Karasch. In 1850, crown land was divided into five districts and the territory of Batschka-Torontal District was divided among Neusatz District, Zombor District and Großbetschkerek District.

In 1860, the Voivodeship of Serbia and Banat of Temeschwar and its five districts were abolished and the territory of the Großbetschkerek District was administratively included into the Torontal County (part of the Austrian Kingdom of Hungary).

Geography
The Großbetschkerek District included north-western parts of Banat. It shared borders with the Zombor District and Neusatz District in the west, Temeschwar District in the east, Austrian Military Frontier in the south-west, and Austrian Kingdom of Hungary in the north.

Demographics
According to 1850 census, the population of the district numbered 388,704 residents, including:
Germans = 126,730 (32.6%)
Serbs = 124,111 (31.93%)
Hungarians = 60,781 (15.64%)
Romanians = 58,292 (15%)
Bulgarians = 11,045 (2.84%)
Croats = 3,752 (0.97%)
Slovaks = 2,562 (0.66%)
Jews = 1,421 (0.37%)

Cities and towns
Main cities and towns in the district were:
Groß Sankt Nikolaus (Sânnicolau Mare)
Großbetschkerek (Veliki Bečkerek)
Großkikinda (Velika Kikinda)
Hatzfeld (Jimbolia)
Modosch (Modoš)
Neu Betsche (Novi Bečej)
Neu Kanischa (Turska Kanjiža)
Pardan (Pardanj)
Perjamosch (Periam)
Tschene (Cenei)
Tschoka (Čoka)
Zichydorf (Zičidorf)

Most of the mentioned cities and towns are today in Serbia, while towns of Groß Sankt Nikolaus (Sânnicolau Mare), Perjamosch (Periam), Hatzfeld (Jimbolia) and Tschene (Cenei) are today in Romania.

See also
Zrenjanin
Voivodeship of Serbia and Banat of Temeschwar

References

Further reading
Dr Saša Kicošev - Dr Drago Njegovan, Razvoj etničke i verske strukture Vojvodine, Novi Sad, 2010.
Dr Drago Njegovan, Prisajedinjenje Vojvodine Srbiji, Novi Sad, 2004.

External links
Map of the District
Map of the District
Map of the District

Zrenjanin
History of Banat
Voivodeship of Serbia and Banat of Temeschwar
1850 establishments in Europe
1860 disestablishments in Europe